Tongue bifurcation, splitting or forking, is a type of body modification in which the tongue is cut centrally from its tip to as far back as the underside base, forking the end.

Bifid tongue in humans may also be an unintended complication of tongue piercings or a rare congenital malformation associated with maternal diabetes, orofaciodigital syndrome 1, Ellis–Van Creveld syndrome, Goldenhar syndrome, and Klippel–Feil syndrome.

Practice
Deliberate tongue splitting is a cosmetic body modification procedure that results in a ‘lizard-like’ bifid tongue. Tongue bifurcation has also been reported as an unintended complication of tongue piercing.  

According to Google Trends, search interest in tongue splitting peaked in 2004, and has the highest search interest in South America followed by the Post-Soviet States, then the Anglosphere.

Process 
Tongue bifurcation may be done surgically using a scalpel, or cauterised with a laser. It is performed by oral surgeons, plastic surgeons, or body modification practitioners, or done oneself, but only oral and plastic surgeons are licensed. Before splitting with any method, some choose to have a well-healed tongue piercing where the back end of the split is intended to be. This effectively prevents the tongue from healing forward from the back of the cut, which would result in a split that is not as deep as desired.

When using the scalpel method, the tongue is cut down the middle with a scalpel and each half is stitched or sutured along the cut edge. This helps prevent the sides from healing back to each other and also achieves a more rounded and natural look. In some cases the scalpel is heated to provide a cauterizing effect, limiting bleeding.

Cauterizing can be done with a cautery unit or an argon laser. Both burn the tongue in half which closes off blood vessels, preventing much bleeding. If an established tongue piercing is not used as the back end of the split with this method, the tongue has a higher tendency to heal and the procedure must be done again to achieve the depth desired. 

The tongue generally heals in 1–2 weeks, during which time the person may have difficulty with speech or their normal dietary habits. Splitting may be reversed surgically by removal of sutures, excision of healed tissue on edges, and re-suturing the tongue together. 

Once healed, muscle control of the individual sides can be gained with practice if the split is sufficiently deep. The two halves can be raised up and down opposite each other, spread apart from the other half which makes the split quite apparent and some objects can be grasped onto and held.  

Bifid tongues may be concealed if desired by holding the two halves together. When the two sides are held together, it may appear as though there is only a deep crevice in the centre of the tongue.

Complications 
Surgical tongue splitting may result in inflammation, bleeding (including hemorrhage), infection, and injury to nerves or arteries on the tongue.
A bifurcated tongue may also perceptibly alter fricative production.  Resulting scar tissue may also affect speech.

Motivation
Proponents of body modifications such as tongue bifurcation may feel that body modification leads to a sense of strength and empowerment, assists pair or group bonding, or emotional 'healing' from past trauma. Proponents may simply like the appearance, considering it beautiful, enjoy the novelty or shock value, or believe it leads to increased sensation or enhancement when kissing. Challenging oneself, rites of passage, connecting with or being in control of one's body, making a spiritual connection or testing the body's limits are also reasons given. Like all body modifications, it can be used to connect or identify with a specific group or to ward off those who would make quick undesired judgments based on appearance.

Legality
The legality of tongue splitting varies greatly depending on the country and within those countries, individual states or territories. Some examples are given below, but do not encompass all the laws regarding this subject.

United States of America 
Some branches of the U.S. military ban body modifications that detract from a professional military image and explicitly include tongue splitting or forking as examples.

In 2003, Illinois became the first state in the U.S. to regulate tongue splitting, passing a law making it illegal to perform the procedure on another person, unless it is done by someone licensed to practice medicine. The law does not appear to prohibit performing the procedure on one's self. Since then New York, Delaware, and Texas have enacted laws that either ban the practice, ban the procedure on minors without parental consent, or restrict it to being performed by only doctors and/or dentists.

Australia  
In 2009, the Australian state of Victoria enacted a ban on splitting the tongues of minors.

United Kingdom  
In 2017 Brendan McCarthy was charged in the United Kingdom for a number of body modifications including tongue splitting. He pleaded guilty in 2019 to causing grievous bodily harm with intent.

Cases of body modification artists illegally possessing and injecting local anaesthetics for tongue bifurcation procedures have also been recorded in England.

In March 2018, the Court of Appeal ruled tongue splitting to be illegal in England and Wales when performed by a body modification practitioner for cosmetic purposes.

Notable cases
Dustin Allor, a 19-year-old body piercer in the U.S., split her tongue in 1996 herself. Not having any reference of this being done before, she came up with the tie-off or fishing line method. In 1997 she was featured on the cover of Fakir Musafar's Body Play Magazine.

A sideshow performer named Erik Sprague, known professionally as The Lizardman, had his tongue split on July 18, 1997. His procedure was performed by oral surgeon Dr. Lawrence Busino, using an argon laser, in what was the first truly professional tongue split. A new deeper split was done on October 3, 1997. This was the third modern tongue bifurcation and the first one done using a laser.

See also
 Forked tongue
 The Lizardman

References 

Body modification
Tongue